RUHS College of Medical Sciences, Jaipur, established in 2014, is a full-fledged tertiary Medical college in Jaipur, India. The college imparts the degree of Bachelor of Medicine and Surgery (MBBS). The college is recognized by National Medical Commission and is a constituent college of the Rajasthan University of Health Sciences. The selection to the college is done on the basis of merit through National Eligibility and Entrance Test. Hospital associated with this college is one of the largest hospital in Jaipur.

Courses
RUHS College of Medical Sciences, Jaipur undertakes the education and training of students in MBBS courses.

References

External links 
http://ruhscms.org/

2014 establishments in Rajasthan
Affiliates of Rajasthan University of Health Sciences
Educational institutions established in 2014
Medical colleges in Rajasthan